Madan Tamang was an Indian politician and the president of Akhil Bharatiya Gorkha League (ABGL), a moderate faction of the Gorkhaland movement. Opposed to violent methods for the process, he stood for a negotiated settlement to the Gorkhaland dispute. He was hacked to death allegedly by Gorkha Janmukti Morcha supporters on 21 May 2010 which led to spontaneous shutdown in the three divisions of the hills Darjeeling, Kurseong and Kalimpong.

Personal life
Madan Tamang was born on 1 June 1948 to Manbahadur Tamang and Lamu Tamang at Meghma village in Darjeeling district. He was the eldest of four brothers. He studied at St Robert's School in Darjeeling and then completed his bachelor's degree in humanities from St Joseph's College at North Point in Darjeeling. He was married to Bharati Tamang. Madan Tamang entered the tea business by establishing a tea estate in his ancestral land around Meghma on the Indo-Nepal border.

Political career
Madan Tamang entered into politics in 1969 while still in college when he became a close associate of the noted ABGL leader of the time, Deo Prakash Rai. Through the 1970s, he headed Tarun Gorkha, the youth wing of the Akhil Bharatiya Gorkha League (ABGL), and became well known for his oratory skills. Eventually, he became the District Secretary of the Gorkha League in 1977, though he resigned in 1980 to join a new outfit, Pranta Parishad, where he worked closely with Subhash Ghisingh for some time till Ghisingh started the Gorkha National Liberation Front (GNLF) in 1980 and demanded the state of Gorkhaland. Meanwhile, the Pranta Parishad along with organizations like the Nepali Bhasa Manyata Samiti started a campaign to include the Nepali language in the Eighth Schedule of the Constitution, and also turned an important rival of Ghisingh. Between 1986 and 1988, he openly criticized Ghisingh for corruption and use of violence for which his ancestral house at Meghma near Sandakphu was torched.

After lying low for some time, in 1992, Tamang started the Gorkha Democratic Front (GDF) to counter GNLF's opposition of the inclusion of the Nepali language in the Constitution because it wanted Gorkhali instead. In 2001, the GDF merged with ABGL, and Madan Tamang became the president of ABGL.

After the downfall of Subhash Ghisingh and GNLF and the rise of a new party Gorkha Janmukti Morcha (GJM) headed by Bimal Gurung in the Darjeeling hills, Madan Tamang became a vocal opponent of the GJM and levelled corruption charges against Bimal Gurung and other GJM leaders. ABGL set up an alliance of eight parties called Democratic Front along with Bharatiya Janata Party (BJP) and Communist Party of Revolutionary Marxists (CPRM) to fight for democracy in the hills through peaceful means and to oppose the GJM from accepting a compromised interim setup in place of a full-fledged state, as originally demanded by the Gorkhaland movement and GJM leaders.

Death
On 21 May 2010, at around 9.30 am, Madan Tamang was supervising arrangements for a meeting scheduled for later in the day near Planters Club, Darjeeling to celebrate the 68th Foundation Day of Akhil Bharatiya Gorkha League, when some 150 armed assailants stormed the venue. While some attackers started throwing stones at the people gathered at the venue, three men attacked Tamang directly and hacked him with khukris, a Gorkha small sword. After being critically injured, he was rushed to the Darjeeling District Hospital where he soon died. Few days later on 25 May, hundreds of mourners joined his funeral procession after which his body was taken to his native village of Meghma for the last rites. Later, his wife Bharati Tamang was elected as the president of ABGL.

Notes

Further reading
 

1948 births
2010 deaths
West Bengal politicians
Deaths by stabbing in India
Assassinated Indian politicians
Indian Gorkhas
People from Darjeeling
People murdered in West Bengal
2010 murders in Asia
2010 murders in India
Tamang people